is a fictional character and one of the protagonists from Intelligent Systems's 2012 role-playing video game Fire Emblem Awakening, part of their overarching Fire Emblem series of video games. Her popularity later led to her inclusion in several other video games, including Intelligent System's 2015 title Code Name: S.T.E.A.M., Nintendo's crossover fighting game Super Smash Bros. for Nintendo 3DS and Wii U and its sequel Super Smash Bros. Ultimate, Capcom's Monster Hunter Frontier G, and Bandai Namco's crossover RPG Project X Zone 2. Lucina would again appear in future Fire Emblem titles as well, including Fire Emblem Fates, Fire Emblem Heroes, Fire Emblem Warriors, and Fire Emblem Engage though in more of a supporting role rather than a protagonist with the latter titles.

History and appearances

In Fire Emblem Awakening 
Lucina originates from the Nintendo and Intelligent Systems video game Fire Emblem Awakening, an entry in their long-running Fire Emblem series of video games. Internally, Awakening was treated as a last-ditch effort to save the series, as declining sales had led Nintendo to deem it the last game in the series if the game did not meet sales goals. Lucina was part of the team's efforts to rework the series' arch-typical medieval fantasy setting and revamping it using elements of time-travel; Lucina travels backward in time from a world in ruins to help her father, Chrom, work towards a different future. Lucina's mother is dependent on the player's choices in the game's relationship and marriage system, another revamped system for the game. Early parts in the game see her dressing up as her ancestor Marth, the protagonist from a number of earlier Fire Emblem titles. Nintendo described her in the game as "an unwavering warrior with a strong sense of justice and commitment to her family...Her power, determination, and wisdom gained from watching the destruction of her world are priceless strengths." Lucina and the rest of the cast were cited as standout aspects of the game that helped in saving the series; Awakening posted strong sales in multiple regions and allowed Nintendo to greenlight further entries in the series.

In other media 
Lucina later appeared in Awakening's follow up, Fire Emblem Fates, though only as an additional downloadable content (DLC) character, not a core character to the game's story. She is also a playable character in Nintendo's mobile entry in the series, Fire Emblem Heroes, and Fire Emblem Warriors, a Tecmo Koei developed musou action game spin-off. Tecmo Koei originally wanted to drop her from the game's story, citing both issues with her time-travelling backstory conflicting with the new story they were trying to tell in the game, and the perception that there were already too many sword-bearing characters unbalancing the game's gameplay. This idea was rejected by Intelligent Systems and Nintendo, deeming her too important to the franchise to be cut from the game. In Fire Emblem Engage, Lucina appears as an Emblem Ring (guest character) alongside other past Fire Emblem protagonists.

Outside of the Fire Emblem series, Lucina was also included in a number of other Nintendo-related games, including the Super Smash Bros. crossover fighting game series. Lucina was a playable character in 2014's Super Smash Bros. for Nintendo 3DS and Wii U as part of the game's core fighting cast, using moves similar to Marth's. Around the same time, she also received her own Amiibo figure from Nintendo. She also appears in the series' 2018 entry, Super Smash Bros. Ultimate, now designated as Marth's "echo fighter". She is also playable in the 2016 tactical role-playing crossover game Project X Zone 2, appearing as part of a pair unit with her father Chrom. A downloadable addition to the Japan-only Monster Hunter Frontier G allowed for the player to dress their avatar as Lucina in the game's Wii U version. Lucina is featured as a bonus playable character in Code Name: S.T.E.A.M., where she is made playable upon the player linking their Amiibo with the game.

Good Smile Company launched a figma figurine based on Lucina in 2014.

Reception 
The character of Lucina has received positive attention from journalists as part of Nintendo's efforts to better appeal to the female demographics of video gaming. Nintendo used her as one of their female characters used to recreate the Rosie the Riveter We Can Do It poster as part of the company's Women's History Month celebration in March 2015, with her being one of the few characters used who was not criticized by journalists for being a damsel in distress, oversexualized, or merely a female version of a male character. Other journalists praised her inclusion as part of Nintendo's efforts to have more female character in games, including her starring role in Fire Emblem Awakening, and the increased percentage of female characters in the roster for Super Smash Bros for Nintendo 3DS and Wii U. While The Mary Sue initially resented the fact that the initial trailer for her revealed appearance in Super Smash Bros. led to Lucina, a female, having to be rescued by Robin, a male, the concern was later retracted upon the realization that the Robin character can be chosen to be male or female in the game itself. In Fire Emblem character popularity polls running up to the release of Fire Emblem Heroes, Lucina was ranked number 2 in the female character polls in North America. The top four characters in the polls received new in-game costumes; Kotaku praised both Lucina's original costume, and the revised one, for striking a good balance between looking stylish while still appearing to look like traditionally functional armor as well.

As a fighter in Super Smash Bros. specifically, her inclusion was generally well-received, although her initial reveal lead to concerns that she was too similar in playing style to Marth, in a game series that stresses that each character be different in play-style. The director of Super Smash Bros., Masahiro Sakurai, addressed the concern directly and stated that there were enough differences in balance and size to warrant her being a separate character. With eight total Fire Emblem characters appearing in Super Smash Bros. Ultimate, complaints again arose that she played too similarly to other characters.

References 

Female characters in video games
Fictional cross-dressers
Fictional swordfighters in video games
Nintendo protagonists
Orphan characters in video games
Role-playing video game characters
Super Smash Bros. fighters
Video game characters introduced in 2012
Princess characters in video games
Fictional characters displaced in time
Woman soldier and warrior characters in video games
Fire Emblem characters